Justice Jones may refer to:

 Benjamin R. Jones (1906–1980), justice of the Pennsylvania Supreme Court
 Burr W. Jones (1846–1935), associate justice of the Wisconsin Supreme Court
 Charles Alvin Jones (1887–1966), chief justice of the Supreme Court of Pennsylvania
 Charles E. Jones (judge) (born 1935), justice of the Arizona Supreme Court
 Horatio M. Jones (1826–1906), associate justice of the Territorial Supreme Court of Nevada
 Hugh R. Jones (1914–2001), judge of the New York Court of Appeals
 Ira B. Jones (1851-1927), chief justice of the South Carolina Supreme Court
 Isaac Thomas Jones, associate justice of the Maryland Court of Appeals
 J. Fred Jones, associate justice of the Arkansas Supreme Court
 Jim Jones (judge) (born 1942), justice of the Idaho Supreme Court
 John Rice Jones (1759–1824), associate justice of the Missouri Supreme Court
 Norman L. Jones (1870–1940), associate justice of the Illinois Supreme Court
 Pleas Jones (1912–1986), associate justice of the Kentucky Court of Appeals and the Kentucky Supreme Court
 Richard L. Jones (1923–1996), associate justice of the Alabama Supreme Court
 Robert Byron Jones (1833–1867), associate justice of the Louisiana Supreme Court
 Robert E. Jones (judge) (born 1927), associate justice of the Oregon Supreme Court
 Theodore T. Jones (1944–2012), judge on New York State's Court of Appeals
 Thomas Jones (British justice) (1614–1692), chief justice of the Common Pleas
 Thomas Jones (Maryland judge) (1735–1812), associate justice of the Maryland Court of Appeals
 Thomas A. Jones (1859–1937), associate justice of the Ohio Supreme Court
 Warren Jones (Idaho judge) (1943–2018), justice of the Idaho Supreme Court
 William E. Jones (politician) (1808 or 1810–1871), associate justice of the Texas Supreme Court
 William J. Jones (1810–1897), associate justice of the Texas Supreme Court

See also
Judge Jones (disambiguation)